Tascina nicevillei is a moth in the Castniidae family. It is found in the Tanintharyi Region of southern Myanmar.

References

Moths described in 1895
Castniidae